Woodland Cemetery may refer to:

 Woodland cemetery, a type of cemetery

or it may refer to specific places:

in Sweden
 Skogskyrkogården (The Woodland Cemetery) in Stockholm, Sweden

in the United States (by state)
 Woodland Cemetery (Quincy, Illinois), listed on the National Register of Historic Places (NRHP)
 Woodland Cemetery (Des Moines, Iowa)
 Woodland Cemetery (Monroe, Michigan)
 Woodland Cemetery (Newark, New Jersey)
 Woodland Cemetery (Staten Island, New York), in Grymes Hill, Staten Island
 Woodland Cemetery (Cleveland), Ohio, listed on the NRHP
 Woodland Cemetery and Arboretum, Dayton, Ohio, listed on the NRHP
 Woodlands Cemetery, Philadelphia, Pennsylvania
 Woodland Cemetery (Richmond, Virginia), a historically African American cemetery

See also 
 Waldfriedhof (disambiguation)
 Woodlawn Cemetery (disambiguation)